National American Bank Building is a 23-story -tall skyscraper in the Central Business District of New Orleans, Louisiana,  It was completed in 1929 and listed on the National Register of Historic Places in 1986. It is topped with a distinctive 6-story octagonal tower with a golden Art Deco finial. Its address is 200 Carondelet Street. Originally a commercial building, it was renovated for use as a residential building after Hurricane Katrina.

Description 
The building was constructed from 1928 to 1929, under the direction of Louisiana architect Moise Goldstein; the general contractor was George J. Glover Company. Construction consisted of a steel skeleton, concrete, and hollow tiles.  Bricks were used for common walls. The base of the building was faced with polished granite, and a limestone facade was used on the upper floors. On top of the 23rd floor is a 6-story octagonal tower, covered by an ornamental finial. The building was the first in New Orleans to utilize indoor air-conditioning within a public space.

In the late 1980s, when the building was assessed for National Register listing, the interior lobby area was marble clad, and the ceiling was described as, "gold and silver leaf pressed metal with a repeating chevron and diamond point pattern". The banking hall roof was supported by columns, and bronze was used for elevator doors, panels, and check stations.  The banking hall also retained its original chandeliers, as well as walnut paneling on the walls.

History 

During peak occupation of the building in the 20th century, banks utilized the ground floor and mezzanine, while upper floors were occupied by law firms and other businesses. By 2000, the building was vacant. In the aftermath of Hurricane Katrina, renovation opportunities arose to replace thousands of rental units lost in the storm. Renovation of the structure was completed in 2008, using public and private investment to convert the building into mixed income residential apartments, under the name "200 Carondelet".

It was included as a contributing building in the National Register listing of the New Orleans Lower Central Business District in 1991.

See also
 List of tallest buildings in New Orleans

References

External links

200 Carondelet
Project 200 Carondelet

Skyscraper office buildings in New Orleans
Office buildings completed in 1929
Art Deco architecture in Louisiana
Bank buildings on the National Register of Historic Places in Louisiana
National Register of Historic Places in New Orleans
1929 establishments in Louisiana
New Orleans Lower Central Business District